In the 2008 United States presidential election, fundraising increased significantly compared to the levels achieved in previous presidential elections.

According to required campaign filings as reported by the Federal Election Commission (FEC), 148 candidates for all parties collectively raised $1,644,712,232 and spent $1,601,104,696 for the primary and general campaigns combined through November 24, 2008. The amounts raised and spent by the major candidates, according to the same source, were as follows:

Democratic Party candidate Barack Obama created a broad grassroots movement and a new method of campaigning by courting and mobilizing activists, donations, and voters through the Internet (see grassroots fundraising). It was part of a campaign that mobilized grassroots workers in every state. Obama also set fundraising records in more than one month by gaining support from a record-breaking number of individual small donors.

The reported cost of campaigning for president has increased significantly in recent years. One source reported that if the costs for both Democratic and Republican campaigns were added together (for the presidential primary election, general election, and the political conventions), the costs have more than doubled in only eight years ($448.9 million in 1996, $649.5 million in 2000, and $1.01 billion in 2004). In January 2007, Federal Election Commission Chairman Michael E. Toner estimated that the 2008 race would be a $1 billion election, and that to be taken seriously, a candidate would have needed to raise at least $100 million by the end of 2007.

Although he had said he would not be running for president, published reports in 2007 indicated that billionaire and New York City mayor Michael Bloomberg had been considering a presidential bid as an independent with up to $1 billion of his own fortune to finance it. Bloomberg ultimately ended this speculation by unequivocally stating that he would not run. Had Bloomberg decided to run, he would not have needed to campaign in the primary elections or participate in the conventions, reducing both the necessary length and cost of his campaign.

With the increase in money expenditures, many candidates did not use the public financing system funded by the presidential election campaign fund checkoff. John McCain, Tom Tancredo, John Edwards, Chris Dodd, and Joe Biden qualified for and elected to take public funds throughout the primary process. Major Democratic candidates Hillary Clinton and Barack Obama chose not to participate in the public financing system.

Howard Dean collected large contributions through the Internet in his 2004 primary run. In 2008, candidates went even further to reach out to Internet users through their own sites and such sites as YouTube, MySpace, and Facebook.

On December 16, 2007, Ron Paul collected $6 million, more money on a single day through Internet donations than any presidential candidate to date, though this was exceeded with a $10 million day in September 2008 by Barack Obama.

Fundraising plays a central role in many presidential campaigns and is a key factor in determining the viability of candidates.  Money raised is applied in many ways, such as for the salaries of non-volunteers in the campaign, transportation, campaign materials, and media advertisements.  Under United States law, candidates are required to file campaign finance details with the Federal Elections Commission (FEC) at the end of every calendar quarter.  Summaries of these reports are made available to the public shortly thereafter, revealing the relative financial situations of all the campaigns.

Election cycle summary
On February 22, 2008, the New York Times reported for the period through January 31, 2008, with Hillary Clinton's campaign spending $106 million, Barack Obama's campaign spending $115 million and John McCain's committee $41 million."
In general, the current Federal Election Commission election cycle-to-date statistics may be viewed online, in summary and tabular form.

Through December 31, 2007
Quarterly FEC reports summarize the total contributions (from individuals, political party committees, other political committees, and the candidate), loans, receipts (incoming money), and disbursements (outgoing money) for the election cycle.  The tables immediately below include finance totals from the start of the election cycle up to December 31, 2007.  All values in US dollars.  Candidates sorted by total campaign contributions. Another key factor in the Presidential Campaign finance is the so called "Individual Financing"

Democrats

† This candidate has withdrawn their presidential bid.

‡ This candidate has suspended their presidential bid.

Republicans

† This candidate has withdrawn their presidential bid.

‡ This candidate has suspended their presidential bid.

4th quarter 2007
This is a summary of campaign finance for the fourth quarter of 2007, spanning from October 1, 2007, to December 31, 2007.  All data has been extracted from reports provided by the Federal Elections Commission.

By default, the tables below sort the candidates by Receipts without loans for the 4th quarter of 2007.  These values are largely composed of campaign contributions, but also include offsets to expenditures (refunds, rebates, etc.) and other receipts (dividents, interest, etc.).  To sort by another value, click the column's icon.  All values in US Dollars.

Democrats

† This candidate has withdrawn his presidential bid.

‡ This candidate has suspended his/her presidential bid.

Republicans

† This candidate has withdrawn his presidential bid.

‡ This candidate has suspended his presidential bid.

3rd quarter 2007
Campaign Finance Information according to the Federal Elections Commission for the end of the third calendar quarter 2007, ending September 30, 2007. The committees reporting may have amended their filings in the months following the initial reporting deadlines.

Democrats

Republicans

† Number equals third quarter totals only.  Friends of Fred Thompson Inc. received $3,077,290 covering the period June 4, 2007, to June 30, 2007, and reported $12,828,110 in total receipts for the third quarter report.

2nd quarter 2007

Campaign Finance Information according to the Federal Elections Commission as of July 17, 2007.

Democrats

Republicans

1st quarter 2007
Campaign Finance Information according to the Federal Elections Commission as of March 31, 2007.

Democrats

Republicans

References

2008 United States presidential primaries